Seres (formerly SF Motors) is a brand of electric vehicle marketed by Seres Group (former Chongqing Sokon Industry Group). Several of their subsidiaries are also named "Seres":

 (former Chongqing Jinkang New Energy Automobile Co., Ltd.) is an R&D and manufacturing subsidiary based in China.

A US subsidiary SF Motors Inc.,, sometimes called Seres, headquartered in Santa Clara, California, represents Jinkang New Energy Automobile's business in US. SF Motors Inc. has established several R&D facilities and is in the process of designing and producing a U.S.-based, electric vehicle line. The company has delayed launching a US product and laid off hundreds of workers, including 90 people at its design studio. The company is partnering with a number of automotive and tech suppliers.

Manufacturing/R&D facilities 
SF Motors Inc. was founded in Santa Clara, California in January 2016 as a company focused on producing electric vehicles. In early 2017, SF Motors’ parent company, Sokon Industry Group, was granted production permits from the Chinese government to produce electric vehicles.

The company has established seven R&D facilities in four countries, including the U.S., China, and Germany, with Japan coming online soon. Along with establishing an R&D center in the Ann Arbor area in Michigan; Seres is also partnering with the University of Michigan’s Mcity innovation center, which is dedicated to leading the transformation to connected and automated vehicles. SF Motors hosted its first University of Michigan-Sokon Autonomous Driving Seminar in August 2017. All of Seres’ R&D facilities will focus on intelligent e-powertrain technology, vehicle engineering, intelligent driving systems, next-generation battery technology and lightweight designs.

In 2017, SF Motors completed the acquisition of the AM General Commercial Assembly Plant in Mishawaka, Indiana, making it the only electric vehicle company at the time to have manufacturing facilities in both the U.S. and China. It will be the first manufacturing plant in the U.S. that is wholly owned by SF Motors. The acquisition includes retaining about 430 employees at the facility who previously helped build vehicles for both Mercedes-Benz and Hummer.

Headquarters 
In order to secure a space for its leaders, teams and prospective employees, the company recruited design firm AAI to build out its Santa Clara, California headquarters, which opened in March 2017. The four-story building can accommodate more than 200 people.

The building has a garage with EV charging stations.

Timeline 

 January 28, 2016 — SF Motors was founded in Silicon Valley, California
 September 2016 — Tesla co-founder Martin Eberhard joined SF Motors as Strategic Advisor
 January 2017 — Parent company of SF Motors (Sokon Industry Group) granted production permit from Chinese Government to produce electric vehicles
 March 2017 — SF Motors opens headquarters in Silicon Valley
 April 2017 — Parent company of SF Motors, Sokon Motors, and University of Michigan announce plans to establish Michigan-Sokon Research Center
 June 2017 — SF Motors announces plans to acquire commercial automotive assembly plant in Mishawaka, Indiana from AM General where Hummer H2 SUVs were formerly built.
 July 2017 — SF Motors hosts first Global Partnership Meeting at its headquarters in Silicon Valley
 July 2017 — SF Motors establishes intelligent driving research center in Beijing
 August 2017 — SF Motors hosts first University of Michigan-Sokon Autonomous Driving Seminar
 September 2017 — SF Motors’ parent company granted permission by Chinese Government to issue convertible bond worth up to 1.5 Billion RMB for SF Motors
 October 2017 — SF Motors announced the acquisition of InEVit Inc., an electric vehicle battery modularization startup headed by Martin Eberhard, industry leader and co-founder of Tesla, who joined the company as Chief Scientist and Vice Chairman of SF Motors’ Board.
 March 2018 — SF Motors unveils its cars, two all-electric sport utility vehicles, the compact SF5 and the mid-size SF7.
 July 2019 — Plans to assemble the company’s first vehicle, an SUV called the SF5, have been halted for the U.S. market. Plans to assemble and sell SF5 in China continue unchanged. Layoffs have been announced at the company’s California headquarters.
 That same month, Autocar reported that the company was in search of British partners to manufacture electric vehicles for SF Motors. SF Motors will serve as a supplier and would provide electric motors, and battery packs to any potential partners.
In April 2021, Seres launched an updated SF5, starting a partnership with Huawei, which partook in the development of the vehicle, and sells the cars through Huawei stores. According to sources cited by Reuters, Huawei was looking to take over Seres from its parent company Chongqing Sokon, but Huawei denied having plans for such an acquisition.

Leadership 
 John Zhang — CEO
 Yifan Tang — CTO

Products

Seres
 3/ix3, a rebadged Dongfeng Fengon E3
 SF5

Aito
 Aito M5 PHEV/ EV
 Aito M7 PHEV

See also 
 Faraday Future

References

External links 
 Official website: http://www.sfmotors.com

Companies based in Santa Clara, California
Motor vehicle manufacturers based in California
American companies established in 2016
Vehicle manufacturing companies established in 2016
Electric vehicle manufacturers of the United States
Car brands
Car manufacturers of the United States
American brands
Vehicles codeveloped with Huawei